Ferry Svan is a Swedish professional woodchopper and logging sportsman, and the son of champion skier Gunde Svan. He is the first Swedish person to compete in a World Championship in logging sports, the first Swede to win a World Championship, and the youngest person to compete in logging sports as a Senior athlete. He has previously held four Swedish national records. He competes in the Stihl Timbersports Series.

Logging sports

Junior career
In 2014 he went to his first Nordic games for logging sports, where he took gold as a junior, repeating this feat in 2016. It was at this point that Svan took up logging full-time, returning to his parents' farm to train. He said that full-time training is hard, but pays off, and that doing it alone he spends more time preparing his timber than he does actually practising chopping. His aim for 2017 was to become a professional logging athlete; though the sport has about 500 "active athletes" regularly competing, only a few of these can actually make money from it. He explained his reason for moving home was mostly financial, but did add that his father has good experience in training regimens that would be helpful. He also expressed an interest in attending training camps around the world to learn from pros.

In 2017 he qualified for the World Junior Championship, which was held in Hamburg, Germany. He was the first Swede to do so, and won the competition after having taken the lead after only two events, also becoming the first Swede to win a World Championship. Before the competition, he had said he was hoping to place in the top 5. Later in 2017 he competed in the Italian junior championship, where he placed fourth.

Senior career

To introduce his senior career, Svan appeared on the show Bingolotto on 11 June 2017, where he performed multiple woodchopping events.

In summer 2017 he again competed in the Nordic championship, now as a senior, and placed second. He was the youngest person to ever compete in the sport as a senior. In October 2017, he competed in the European Champions Trophy Senior competition qualifiers, but also was able to take an automatic wild card spot because of his World Championship title.

At the start of April 2018, Svan gained sponsorship from Swedish chainsaw safety company Axelent AB, which he explained he has a lot in common with because of both their focuses on precision work and safety. With the sponsorship, because he still wasn't earning enough from wins to live off, he intended to move to New Zealand and train, because the sport is very popular there.

In early April 2018, Svan experienced an injury while training. He dropped an axe after chopping down trees to prepare for training and, to save it from falling down a hill, instinctively tried to catch it on his ankle, in what he calls a "stupid move". Initially it looked like a surface wound, but after being unable to move his foot he returned to hospital. He had severed a tendon and required surgery, which was his first operation, and had to be put in a plaster cast for 6 weeks. The Champions Trophy competition, held in Marseille, France, was in late May 2018, 6-7 weeks later. However, he still managed to compete. At this competition he also became the youngest person to compete as a senior in an international competition.

In the first round of the Champions Trophy, Svan competed against Andrea Rossi, who ended up disqualified. In the quarterfinals, he competed against Martin Komarek, who beat his time, with Svan ultimately placing eighth. In each stage of this competition, he broke his own personal best. He said that making it to the quarterfinals was beyond his expectations and he was proud of knocking 15 seconds off some of his personal records, calling himself a "giant" for the achievements; in the heat he lost, he attained what was a new Swedish national record.

Svan's performance at the 2019 Timbersports Champions Trophy competition, in Kungsbacka, saw him set a new personal best, but missing out on his target of a top-5 placement, losing to Michal Dubicki in the quarter finals.

Competitions

Statistics 
As of December 2019, Svan's statistics are:

Notes

References

1996 births
Living people
Lumberjack sports players
People from Vansbro Municipality
Swedish sportsmen